The 2017 Arizona State Sun Devils football team represented Arizona State University in the 2017 NCAA Division I FBS football season. The Sun Devils were led by sixth-year head coach Todd Graham and played their home games at Sun Devil Stadium. They competed as a member of the South Division of the Pac-12 Conference. They finished the season 7–6, 6–3 in Pac-12 play to finish in second place in the South Division. They were invited to the Sun Bowl where they lost to NC State.

On November 26, one day after the conclusion of the regular season, Graham and Arizona State agreed to part ways. He continued to coach the team through their bowl game.

Preseason

Coaching changes
Arizona State hired Phil Bennett as defensive coordinator on January 11, 2017. Bennett was previously the defensive coordinator at Baylor University. He replaced Keith Patterson, who remained on the staff as linebackers coach.

Arizona State hired Billy Napier as offensive coordinator on January 28, 2017. Napier was previously the receivers coach at the University of Alabama. He replaced Chip Lindsey, who left to become the offensive coordinator at Auburn University.

Recruiting class

Incoming transfers
Arizona State had one incoming transfer. Quarterback Blake Barnett transferred from Alabama. Barnett was eligible to play the entire 2017 season at Arizona State following an appeal to the NCAA.

Offseason departures
Arizona State lost 18 players in the 2016 offseason, 13 due to graduation and 5 due to transferring or injuries.

Schedule
Arizona State announced their 2017 football schedule on January 18, 2017. In non-conference play, the Sun Devils played former Border Conference rivals New Mexico State and Texas Tech, as well as San Diego State. In Pac-12 conference play, they played all conference members except cross-divisional foes California and Washington State.

Source: 2017 Arizona State Sun Devils Football Schedule

Game summaries

New Mexico State

San Diego State

at Texas Tech

Oregon

at Stanford

Washington

at Utah

USC

Colorado

at UCLA

at Oregon State

Arizona

vs. NC State (Sun Bowl)

Personnel

Final roster

Coaching staff

Players in the 2018 NFL draft

References

Arizona State
Arizona State Sun Devils football seasons
Arizona State Sun Devils football